Eucereon darantasia is a moth of the subfamily Arctiinae. It was described by Herbert Druce in 1895. It is found in Costa Rica.

References

 

darantasia
Moths described in 1895